Rössypottu is a traditional Finnish dish which originates from the Oulu region yet is very much unknown in the southern parts of the country. Essentially a very simple dish, it is a stew made using potatoes (pottu, peruna), some pork and the main ingredient, so-called "rössy" i.e. blodpalt made of blood, beer, rye flour and some spices.

See also
 List of stews

Finnish stews
Blood dishes
Potato dishes
Pork dishes